Mario Pezzi may refer to:

 Mario Pezzi (aviator) (1898 – 1968), Italian pilot
 Mario Pezzi (priest) (born 1941), leader in the Neocatechumenal Way.